Oliver Dimsdale (born 28 October 1972) is an English actor, known for portraying Louis Trevelyan in the BBC TV serial He Knew He Was Right.

Early life and education
Born in Aylesbury, Buckinghamshire, he was brought up in Hertfordshire. Dimsdale is the son of a Swiss mother. He has a sister, Anna. He developed a stammer at the age of six, which he has since partially brought under control through speech therapy. Dimsdale attended the Dragon School and then Eton College, and went on to study French and Economics at university. He trained at Guildhall School of Music and Drama, graduating in 1999.

Career
Dimsdale began his performing career at the age of thirteen in a radio play for the BBC. He has lent his voice to the radio productions In The Company of Men and Sharp Focus. His film credits include RocknRolla (2008), Cosi (2010) and the short film Pest.

On television, he played the lead roles of Louis Trevelyan in the 2004 adaptation of He Knew He Was Right, and Dr Felix Quinn in the 2008 ITV1 medical drama Harley Street. He has also made guest appearances in Doctors, Casualty and Lark Rise to Candleford.

Dimsdale is the co-founder and co-Artistic Director of Filter Theatre. His theatre work includes Great Expectations, The Changeling, Five Finger Exercise and The Tempest.

Personal life
Dimsdale married actress Zoë Tapper on 30 December 2008. In April 2011, she gave birth to their daughter.

Awards
Dimsdale won Best Fringe Performer in the 2002 Manchester Evening News Theatre Awards, for the Royal Exchange performance of Paul Herzberg's The Dead Wait.

Filmography

Television

Film

Video games

Theatre
Water, Lyric Hammersmith, October - November 2007
Pravda, Chichester Festival Theatre, September 2006 (playing Andrew May)
The Caucasian Chalk Circle, Cottesloe Theatre, March - April 2006, (playing Fat Prince)
Twelfth Night, Tricycle Theatre, September 2008 (playing Toby Belch)

References

External links

Filter Theatre

1972 births
Living people
Alumni of the Guildhall School of Music and Drama
British people of Swiss descent
People from Aylesbury
English male television actors
English male film actors
English male stage actors
English male radio actors
People educated at The Dragon School
People educated at Eton College